The Widow of Montiel is a 1979 Mexican-Colombian drama film directed by Chilean filmmaker Miguel Littín. It is based on a short story of the same name by Gabriel García Marquez. It was entered into the 30th Berlin International Film Festival.

Cast
 Geraldine Chaplin - Adelaida
 Nelson Villagra - Chepe Montiel
 Katy Jurado - Mamá Grande
 Eduardo Gil
 Pilar Romero - Hilaria
 Ernesto Gómez Cruz - Carmichael
 Reynaldo Miravalles
 Alejandro Parodi - Alacaide

References

External links

1979 films
1979 drama films
1970s Spanish-language films
Films directed by Miguel Littín
Colombian drama films
Mexican drama films
Films based on works by Gabriel García Márquez
1970s Mexican films